The 1978 World Series of Poker (WSOP) was a series of poker tournaments held in May 1978 at Binion's Horseshoe, and was the first WSOP that was not a winner-take-all prize. 
Instead the tournament had a progressive prize structure, as follows 50 percent for the Winner then 20 for second, 15 for third, 10 for fourth, and 5 percent for fifth place.

Preliminary events

Main event

There were 42 entrants to the main event. Each paid $10,000 to enter the tournament. The 1978 Main Event was the first of its kind to pay prize money to any players other than the winner.

Final table

Performance of past champions
Day one: Johnny Moss, Thomas "Amarillo Slim" Preston, Walter "Puggy" Pearson, Brian "Sailor" Roberts, Doyle Brunson

Other notable players
Gabe Kaplan and Barbara Freer (the first woman player).

Notes 

World Series of Poker
World Series of Poker